The 2021 Nur-Sultan Challenger II was a professional tennis tournament played on indoor hard courts. It was the fourth edition of the tournament which was part of the 2021 ATP Challenger Tour. It took place in Nur-Sultan, Kazakhstan between 1 and 7 March 2021.

Singles main-draw entrants

Seeds

 1 Rankings are as of 22 February 2021.

Other entrants
The following players received wildcards into the singles main draw:
  Aleksandr Nedovyesov
  Timofey Skatov
  Denis Yevseyev

The following players received entry from the qualifying draw:
  Alibek Kachmazov
  Vladyslav Manafov
  Ryan Peniston
  Wu Tung-lin

The following players received entry as lucky losers:
  Ulises Blanch
  Julian Lenz

Champions

Singles

 Tomáš Macháč def.  Sebastian Ofner 4–6, 6–4, 6–4.

Doubles

 Nathaniel Lammons /  Jackson Withrow def.  Nathan Pasha /  Max Schnur 6–4, 6–2.

References

2021 ATP Challenger Tour
2021 in Kazakhstani sport
March 2021 sports events in Asia